Euglyphia can refer to:

 Euglyphia (protist), a superorder of protists in the phylum Cercozoa
 Diphthera (moth), a genus of moths with the alternative scientific name Euglyphia